SUNY may refer to...

State University of New York
Ronald Grigor Suny
A takeoff on the name Sony as seen on TVs depicted in South Park.  Which incidentally Sony's etymology came from the similarly spelt word "sunny".